Lulong County, formerly Yongping, is a county of Qinhuangdao City, in northeastern Hebei Province, China.

Administrative divisions
The county administers 6 towns and 6 townships.

Towns:
Lulong, Panzhuang, Yanheying, Shuangwang, Liutiangezhuang, Shimen

Townships:
Xiazhai Township, Liujiaying Township, Chenguantun Township, Yinzhuang Township, Gebo Township, Mujing Township

Climate

Transport
China National Highway 102
China National Highway 205
Beijing–Harbin Railway
Beijing–Qinhuangdao Railway
Datong–Qinhuangdao Railway
G1 Beijing–Harbin Expressway

References

External links
Official site of Lulong County
Illustrated Atlas of Shanhai, Yongping, Jizhou, Miyun, Gubeikou, Huanghua Zhen and Other Areas

 
County-level divisions of Hebei
Qinhuangdao